An interfluve is a narrow, elongated and plateau-like or ridge-like landform between two valleys. More generally, an interfluve is defined as an area of higher ground between two rivers in the same drainage system.

Formation 
These landforms are created by earth flow ("solifluction"). They can also be former river terraces that are subsequently bisected by fluvial erosion. In cases where there is a deposit of younger sedimentary beds (loess, colluvium) the interfluves have a rounder and less rugged appearance. A consequence of interfluve formation is the so-called "interfluvial landscape."

Occurrence of interfluvial landscapes  
 In South Burgenland and in the East Styrian Hills of Austria
 the majority of the natural region of the Iller-Lech Plateau in Bavarian Swabia and Upper Swabia (Baden-Württemberg) with the exception of the major river valleys of the Danube, Iller and Lech, the Donauried and the Federseeried as well as the Old Drift landscapes south of the natural region.

See also
Doab
Interamnia (disambiguation)

References 

Geography terminology
Geography of Austria
Geography of Bavaria
Geography of Baden-Württemberg